Jacob Turner Hopkins (born March 4, 2002) is an American actor mainly known for being the voice of Gumball Watterson in the animated show The Amazing World of Gumball.

Early life
Hopkins was born in San Francisco, California, to Gerald and Debra Hopkins. He has an older brother named Gerad (b. 1998).

Career
Hopkins is known for playing the role of Alexander Drew in True Blood, for being the voice of Gumball in The Amazing World of Gumball, after replacing Logan Grove in season 3. During season 5, Hopkins was replaced in the new role of Gumball by Nicolas Cantu, as Hopkins’ voice had changed due to puberty. As of 2021, he made his anime debut as Fushi from To Your Eternity, while also voicing Shun Kamiya from Tribe Nine.

As of 2022, he currently lends his voice in English dubs for Funimation, Bang Zoom!, Studiopolis and Sound Cadence Studios.

Filmography

References

External links

 
 

2002 births
American male child actors
American male voice actors
American people of Italian descent
Male actors from San Francisco
American male television actors
American male film actors
Living people